R. Nallakannu (born 26 December 1925) is an Indian politician. He is a senior leader of the Communist Party of India (CPI). He was the former State Secretary of the Communist Party of India of Tamil Nadu.

Early life
Nallakannu was born in the temple town of Thiruvaikuntam, Thoothukudi district. Born in an affluent family, he was patriotic from a young age and participated in the freedom struggle.

Career
At age 15, Nallakannu joined the communist movement. He belonged to the action force and was sentenced to over 14 years in jail. He was released after 7 years, as a pact was signed by the communist leaders and the chief minister of Tamil Nadu. Highly respected even by opposition parties, he uses restraint when he voices concerns about issues and events. Nallakannu is respected as one of the last surviving leaders who founded the Communist movement in India. 

He is also valued as a learned speaker and a great social reformer, and all his life he fought for equal opportunities for the most socially suffered communities. He stayed with them, had food with them and taught them how to fight for their own rights from the upper classes. He also made considerable progress in lifting the living conditions of poor people in Nanguneri Taluk and neighboring villages, mostly during the period when he was spending his time underground. He is known as an individual ready to make any sacrifice to uphold the principles of a casteless society.

In 2018 he individually fought a court case in Madurai, and won at the High court which ordered a ban on digging sands from the Thamirabarani River of his native place. On 2 December 2010, the court banned the taking of sand from this river for 5 years. He undertook many hunger strikes, some lasting more than 20 days. Once, the government built a dam because of his hunger strike. He was honored by the Vice President of the People's Republic of China during his visit to Beijing.

In 1999, Nallakannu stood for Coimbatore constituency on loksabha elections. Even though he secured 43.21 percent of total votes, he was defeated by CP Radhakrishnan.

Writer 
As a writer, Nallakannu wrote many books based on social problems, river interaction possibilities in India, agricultural reforms and about communist-based articles..

Recognition 

 Sahayogi Puraskar award from Governor Surjit Singh Barnala of Tamil Nadu (14 August 2007). 
 Ambedkar Award for his contribution to public life (2007) Tamil Nadu 
 Gandhian award for social service from All India Mahatma Gandhi Social Welfare Forum (3 October 2008) 
 " Thagaisal Tamizhar" award 2022
 Jeeva Award from District Writers Association (21 January 2009)

Personal life 
Nallakannu married Ranjitham Ammal, a retired school headmistress from Srivaikuntam in Tuticorin district, with whom he had two daughters. Ranjitham died in Chennai in 2016 at age 82.

In 2019, Nallakannu and his family were asked to vacate the house they were living in, which was allotted to them as a tribute to his contributions in the political field. Multiple political leaders expressed their indignation with this decision. DMK President MK Stalin stated that, as a political leader who has been held in high regard, Nallakannu should be allotted another house.

References 

Communist Party of India politicians from Tamil Nadu
Living people
People from Thoothukudi district
1925 births